The Green Paper on Postal Reform (Department of Trade and Industry, 1994) was a United Kingdom government draft plan to privatise and regulate the UK postal services. It set out various options, the key points of the plan being,

writing into law a universal service obligation for 6-day a week delivery and "affordable" prices
a new independent regulator enforcing standards in a new Citizens' charter
keeping Post Office Counters (now Post Office Ltd) under the same arrangement, with 19,000 privately run offices and 800 Crown offices
introducing more competition by further reducing the postal monopoly from £1

Then it laid out the different options for consultation of,
a 100% privatisation in a Stock Exchange flotation to the public and employees, making the Royal Mail a public company,
a provisional conclusion to privatise Royal Mail and Parcelforce, with the government retaining 49% of shares in private companies, or,
giving more commercial freedom to Royal Mail and Parcelforce while leaving them in public ownership.

In the event, the plans did not go through. It met with support from Post Office managers, who advocated full sale because in their view this was the only way to achieve commercial freedom. It met with opposition from unions, much of the public and backbench Conservative MPs.

Debate
On 19 May 1994 the Green Paper was to be presented to the House of Commons. The issue was taken up in Prime Minister's Question Time by Margaret Beckett as leader of the Labour Party opposition.

Later that afternoon Michael Heseltine as The President of the Board of Trade and Secretary of State for Trade and Industry did present the proposals of the Green Paper. The Post Office, he began,

Then followed the debate, opened to the floor of the whole house. Some of the notable contributions are extracted.

See also
Postal Services Act 2000
Postal Services Act 2011

Notes

References
London Economics, The Future of Postal Services: A Critique of the Government's Green Paper (September 1994)

Postal system of the United Kingdom